Porwal is Bania Vaishya community that originated in southern Rajasthan, India. They are mainly of Jain or Hindu faith.

Ancient inscriptions written in Sanskrit refer to the community as Pragvata.

They originated from a region east of ancient Shrimal. In antiquity, they appear to be numerous and among the wealthiest communities in the region.

Many Jain temples were built by the Porwals, including:
 Ranakpur Jain temple of Dharna Shah, completed in 1441 CE 
 Luna Vasahi (1231 CE) of Vastupal and Tejpal at Mount Abu
 The Adinath temple at Shatrunjaya by Javad Shah in 961 AD, which was subsequently renovated several times.

The Porwal community became divided into several regional communities including the Sorathia (in Saurashtra), the Kapol, the Jangad Porwal, and the Porwals found in the Nimad region of Madhya Pradesh. Some of the groups became a part of the Oswal or Navnat communities.

Both Jain traditions, Svetambara and Digambar, are represented among different sections of the Porwal community. The historian H. L. Jain has suggested that Krisha, the patron of Muni Srichandra, a Digambara monk, belonged to the same Ninanvaya clan as Vimala who built the Vimala Vasahi temple at Abu. Thus the one branch of the family followed Swetamabra tradition, while other followed Digambara tradition. This suggests the harmonious coexistence of the two Jain traditions in that region.

In the 16th century, Pushti Marga was founded by Vallabha, a Brahmin scholar from Telangana, who proposed that in the modern age, it is too hard to follow the Jnana & Karma Margs. He proposed Pushti Marga (Raag, Bhog and Shringar used in the seva of Shri Krishna) as an alternative. A section of the Porwals converted to Pushtimarga. Those who have converted to the Pushtimarg are known as Meshri (derived from Maheshwari) or Vania.

Gotras

There are many gotras in the Porwal Community.

See also
 Mumbai

References

Indian Jains
Indian Hindus
Jain communities